Three Came to Kill is a 1960 American crime thriller film directed by Edward L. Cahn and starring Cameron Mitchell and John Lupton. The plot concerns an assassination attempt on a foreign prime minister.

Plot
Marty Brill's (Cameron Mitchell) Los Angeles gang plot to assassinate visiting Asian Prime Minister Gourem-Nara (Frank Lackteen). They break into the home of airport flight controller Hal Parker (John Lupton) and hold his family hostage. Brill threatens to kill Parker's wife June (Lyn Thomas), unless he broadcasts a coded message to identify which plane taking off from the airport is the premier's. They then plot to shoot the plane down. Meanwhile, special agents Ben Scanlon (Paul Langton) and Ray Maguire (Logan Field) close in on the gang.

Cast
Marty Brill – 	Cameron Mitchell
Hal Parker – 	John Lupton
Dave Harris – 	Steve Brodie
June Parker – 	Lyn Thomas
Ben Scanlon – 	Paul Langton
Ipara – 	 Jan Arvan
Ray Maguire – 	 Logan Field
Police Chief Thomas Barrett – 	King Calder
Betty – 	 Jean Ingram
Herb – 	Ron Foster
Ex-Premier Gourem-Nara of Kharem – 	Frank Lackteen

Reception
TV Guide called it a "choppily edited thriller redolent of so many others"; while DVD Talk called it "a tautly-told, intriguing little story perfectly suited to its limited budget. Though a bit flamboyant, Cameron Mitchell is excellent in the leading role, and like other Kent/Hampton/Cahn collaborations the climax is violent and action-packed."

See also
 Inside the Mafia (1959) – A similar film by Edward L. Cahn with Cameron Mitchell
 List of American films of 1960

References

External links

1960 films
1960s English-language films
American black-and-white films
American crime thriller films
1960s crime thriller films
Films directed by Edward L. Cahn
Films about contract killing
Films about assassinations
Films produced by Edward Small
Films scored by Paul Sawtell
1960s American films